Chris Seller (born February 4, 1977 in Richmond, British Columbia) is a former professional indoor lacrosse transition who played for the Buffalo Bandits, Anaheim Storm, Arizona Sting, Calgary Roughnecks and Edmonton Rush in the National Lacrosse League.

Seller was a member of the Canada men's national lacrosse team, winning gold at the 2006 World Lacrosse Championship and silver at the 2002 World Lacrosse Championship.

References

1977 births
Living people
Anaheim Storm players
Arizona Sting players
Buffalo Bandits players
Calgary Roughnecks players
Canadian lacrosse players
Edmonton Rush players
Lacrosse transitions
People from Richmond, British Columbia
Lacrosse people from British Columbia